Shaun Hannah is a Canadian ice hockey coach and former player. He is currently director and coach of the Yale University 8-U and learn-to-skate programs. Previously he was the head coach for Sacred Heart during their transition from Division III to Division I and the shift from the MAAC to Atlantic Hockey.

Career
Hannah began his college hockey career with Cornell in 1990 joining a strong team that finished second in the ECAC. Though the Big Red fell in the semifinals they squeaked into the NCAA tournament with the final eastern berth. In the first game Hannah's team surprised the western 3rd-seeded Michigan with a 5–4 win in overtime but lost the next two games by a combined 15–7 to drop the series. Cornell's record slipped the next season but the Big Red were able to make the conference championship and have a respectable finish to their year. In Hannah's third season the Big Red posted a dismal record, winning only 6 games and failing to even make the conference tournament. There was a small rebound in his senior season, where he was named as team captain, but Cornell was knocked out of the ECAC tournament in the quarterfinals. After graduating with a degree in business management he played two years of professional hockey before retiring.

In 1996 Sacred Heart, a program that was only three years old at the time, was looking for its third head coach and Hannah accepted the position. In Hannah's first season he was able to get the Pioneers to post their first winning season and just over a year later Sacred Heart joined the Division I ranks when it became a founding member of the MAAC ice hockey division. Sacred Heart joined the MAAC as an associate member to fulfill the conference's obligation and the inexperience of the program showed their first year when the team went 7–23–1. A year later, however, the Pioneers had a winning record and the team continued to post good results. Unfortunately the Pioneers could produce very little postseason success and lost five of their six conference playoffs games.

In 2003 both Iona and Fairfield dropped their program and with only one full member left with a hockey program, the MAAC was able to end the division. The remaining nine members then founded a new ice hockey-only conference called Atlantic Hockey. Hannah's team responded positively to the new conference by finishing as runner-up in the first tournament. The Pioneers continued to finish in the middle of the conference for several years until Hannah pushed them to their first 20-win season in 2005–06 with was matched the following year. Sacred Heart slipped to 8th-place by 2009 and though the team was positioned for a rebound Hannah announced that he was stepping down a month before the 2009–10 season saying that he wanted to pursue other career options.

Head coaching record

References

External links

1972 births
Living people
Canadian ice hockey coaches
Cornell Big Red men's ice hockey players
Syracuse Crunch players
Knoxville Cherokees players
Sacred Heart Pioneers men's ice hockey coaches
People from Mankota, Saskatchewan
Ice hockey people from Saskatchewan
Canadian ice hockey forwards